Australian Turf Club (ATC) owns and operates thoroughbred racing, events and hospitality venues across Sydney, Australia. The ATC came into being on 7 February 2011 when the Australian Jockey Club (AJC) and the Sydney Turf Club (STC) merged. The ATC primarily operates out of their offices at Randwick Racecourse and employs approximately 270 full-time staff and over 1,000 casual staff across the five venues. The venues include Randwick, Rosehill Gardens, Canterbury Park, Warwick Farm and the Rosehill Bowling Club.

History

Australian Jockey Club
The Australian Jockey Club (AJC) was founded in January 1842. It morphed from the former Australian Racing Committee set up in May 1840 to set the standards for racing in the colony. Races were held at the newly established Homebush Course which was headquarters of NSW racing until 1860. The AJC was considered the senior racing club in Australia and was responsible for founding the Australian Stud Book, which the combined club still oversees today. The club also, in conjunction with the Victoria Racing Club, formulated the Rules of Racing that are followed by all Australian race clubs.

Sydney Turf Club
The Sydney Turf Club (STC) was founded in 1943 and was the youngest of Australia's principal race clubs. It was formed following an Act passed by the New South Wales parliament called the Sydney Turf Club Act. The Act had taken 40 years to draft and gave the club the power to hold 62 race meetings a year at the  tracks and empowered it to wind up other proprietary clubs that still existed in the Sydney area through a special Racing Compensation Fund.

Merger
Both the AJC and the STC had co-existed as independent bodies since the early 1940s. However, the first push for a merger came at the start of the century, with STC chairman Graeme Pash opening up the possibility of a merger during his tenure. Mentioned briefly in jest by Sydney Morning Herald journalist Craig Young in 2003, the first real push for a merger came with the release of a report by Ernst & Young in June 2009 which recommended that a merger would save the New South Wales racing industry from collapse. The Government of New South Wales pledged $174 million for Sydney racing if the merger went ahead, including a major revitalisation of Randwick Racecourse. The move for a merger was controversial, with members of both clubs hesitant to lose their respective identities. While AJC members voted in favour of a merger due to financial issues, STC members voted against a merger as they were financially stable. Nevertheless, the board of the STC decided to proceed with a merger.  The Australian Jockey and Sydney Turf Clubs Merger Act 2010 merged the two clubs under the name of the Australian Turf Club.

Venues
Five venues are operated by the ATC:
 Royal Randwick Racecourse
 Rosehill Gardens Racecourse
 Canterbury Park Racecourse
 Warwick Farm Racecourse
 Rosehill Bowling Club

Major races
 The Everest
 Golden Slipper Stakes
 Rosehill Guineas
 Canterbury Guineas
 Sydney Cup
 Australian Derby
 Epsom Handicap
 Doncaster Handicap
 The Galaxy
 All Aged Stakes
 Chipping Norton Stakes
 Queen Elizabeth Stakes
 Golden Eagle

ATC Autumn Carnival and Everest Carnival
ATC's Sydney Autumn Racing Carnival includes the Golden Slipper Carnival at Rosehill Gardens consisting of Ladies Day, Golden Slipper Day and Stakes Day, followed by three racedays at Royal Randwick: The Championships Day 1 (Derby Day), The Championships Day 2 (Queen Elizabeth Stakes Day) and All Aged Stakes Day.

The Everest Carnival in spring features the world's richest race on turf - the $15m The Everest, run in October over 1200m at Royal Randwick. It also features the new "Golden Slam", which gives horses the opportunity to win the Golden Slipper Stakes at age 2, the Golden Rose at age 3 and the Golden Eagle at age 4, with an added $5 million in prizemoney for the trio.

In 2008 the Autumn Carnival was delayed by four weeks due to the 2007 Australian equine influenza outbreak.

See also
Queen's Cup (horse race) (formerly King's Cup), a national race, run at Randwick every 6th year on rotation, from 1928–?

References

External links
 Australian Turf Club website

External links 
 Australian Turf Club
 Rosehill Gardens
 Royal Randwick 
 Sydney Carnival

Equestrian organizations
Horse racing organisations in Australia
Horse racing in Australia
Horse racing meetings
Sport in New South Wales
Sporting clubs in Sydney
2011 establishments in Australia